Century Casino Cape Girardeau, formerly Isle Casino Cape Girardeau, is a casino in Cape Girardeau, Missouri. It opened on October 30, 2012, as Missouri's 13th and final facility. It is owned by Vici Properties and operated by Century Casinos. Century Casino has over 900 slot machines and 21 table games. The casino also has  of meeting and event space with room for 500 guests. The casino has four restaurants on-site.

In December 2019, Eldorado Resorts sold the Isle Casino, along with two other properties, to Century Casinos and Vici Properties. Century bought the casino's operating business for $66 million, while Vici bought the land and buildings for $114 million and leased them to Century. Century stated that the casino would be renamed as Century Casino Cape Girardeau, and that they planned to eventually add a hotel.

See also
 List of casinos in Missouri

References

External links
 

Casinos in Missouri
Casinos completed in 2012
2012 establishments in Missouri